The Australian Petroleum Production and Exploration Association, known as APPEA, is an Australian industry association representing companies which explore and produce oil and gas in Australia. APPEA is a non-profit organisation.

The organisation was originally established in 1959 and previously used the acronym APEA (Australian Petroleum Exploration Association).  It is the peak national body representing the collective interests of the upstream oil and gas exploration and production industry. The association has more than 80 full member companies that explore for and produce Australia's oil and gas resources. APPEA also represents more than 250 associate member companies that provide a wide range of goods and services to the upstream oil and gas industry. APPEA members account for an estimated 98 per cent of the nation's petroleum production

APPEA works with Australia's national, state and territory governments to ensure the country's regulatory and commercial framework promotes investment and maximises the return to the Australian industry and community from developing the nation's oil and gas resources.

APPEA Conference
The APPEA Conference and Exhibition is the largest oil and gas event in the southern hemisphere. The conference bring together business experts, researchers, leading minds and professionals from the oil and gas industry to share their insights, knowledge and experience of the issues surrounding the industry. Each year, this conference highlights and defines the issues and challenges of upstream petroleum exploration and development on a national and international level. In 2010 the APPEA conference won "Association or Government Meeting of the Year" award from Meetings & Events Australia.

The APPEA Conference attracts more than 3000 delegates, exhibitors and important players of the global oil and gas industry. The 2019 APPEA Conference will be held in Brisbane, Queensland on 27–30 May 2019.

APPEA Journal 
The APPEA annual conference also involves the presentation of a multidisciplinary technical journal of peer-reviewed papers. The APPEA Journal is recognised in the Australian upstream oil and gas industry as the leading peer-reviewed publication for information on geoscience, engineering and management.

The APPEA Journal (ISSN 1326-4966) is distributed annually to conference attendees. The journal has its roots in the development of the association and the first edition of the APPEA (then APEA) Journal was published in 1961. The APPEA journal is listed on the ERA (Excellence in Research for Australia) 2012 Journal List as ERAID 1707.

Former directors
 James Pearson (2000 - 2002)

See also

 Energy law#Australia

External links
The following websites are produced and managed by APPEA:

 APPEA
 APPEA Conference
 APPEA health, Safety and Environment Conference
 Head Office
 APPEA Events
 Natural CSG
 Seismic Survey 
 WA Onshore Gas
 Stand Together for Safety

References

Business organisations based in Australia
Petroleum industry in Australia
Petroleum organizations
Organizations established in 1959
1959 establishments in Australia